John Marion Williams (December 10, 1935 – September 2, 2021) was an American college football coach. He served as the head football coach at Mississippi College in Clinton, Mississippi from 1972 to 1990, compiling and record of 122–81–3 and winning an NCAA Division II Football Championship in 1989.  Before he was hired at Mississippi College in December 1971, Williams coached high school football in the state of Mississippi.

Williams died on September 2, 2021, at his home in Jackson, Mississippi.

Head coaching record

College

References

1935 births
2021 deaths
Mississippi College Choctaws football coaches
Mississippi College Choctaws football players
High school football coaches in Mississippi
Coaches of American football from Mississippi
Players of American football from Mississippi